Ñawinqucha (Quechua ñawi eye; button hole, -n a suffix, qucha lake, hispanicized spelling Ñahuincocha) is a lake in Peru located in the Junín Region, Huancayo Province, Chongos Alto District. It belongs to the watershed of the Mantaro River. 

It is operated by Electroperu.

References 

Lakes of Peru
Lakes of Junín Region
Dams in Peru
Buildings and structures in Junín Region